Television Centre or TV Centre may refer to:

Television Centre, London, former headquarters of BBC, England
Television Centre, Newcastle upon Tyne, former headquarters of Tyne Tees Television, England
Television Centre, Southampton, former home of three ITV contractors in England
TV Centre (Russia), a state-run Russia TV station

See also
Beijing TV Centre, home to Beijing Television, China
Breakfast Television Centre, the headquarters of MTV Europe, in Camden Town, London, England
RTÉ Television Centre, home to Ireland's national public service broadcaster
Osterley Television Centre (or Sky Studios), Isleworth, London, England
Television Centre Birmingham (or BBC Birmingham), England
Vatican Television Centre, part of Vatican Media, Vatican City